Ruvin or Ruwin is a masculine given name. Notable people with the name include:

 Ruvin Peiris (born 2000), Sri Lankan cricketer
 Ruwin Peiris (born 1970), Sri Lankan first-class cricketer

See also
 Rubin
 Ruvim

Sinhalese masculine given names